Suzdal is a historical town in Vladimir Oblast, Russia.

Suzdal may also refer to:
Suzdal Urban Settlement, a municipal formation which the town of Suzdal in Suzdalsky District of Vladimir Oblast, Russia is incorporated as
Suzdal mine, a gold mine in Kazakhstan
Commander Suzdal, a fictional character from The Crime and the Glory of Commander Suzdal, a 1964 sci-fi short story by Cordwainer Smith

See also
Vladimir-Suzdal Principality (1168–1389), one of the major principalities that succeeded Kievan Rus'
Principality of Suzdal—Nizhny Novgorod
Suzdal Kremlin, the historical kremlin of the town of Suzdal, Russia
Suzdalsky (disambiguation)